SingStar is a competitive music video game series, developed by London Studio and published by Sony Computer Entertainment for the PlayStation 2 and PlayStation 3 video game consoles. SingStar allows 1–2 people to sing karaoke via microphone peripherals in time with on-screen music. The first game in the series, SingStar, was released in Europe and Oceania in 2004. , over seventy titles in the SingStar series have been released PAL region territories, in addition to a small number of releases in North America.

The main difference between each SingStar title is the game's track list. Each edition of the game includes up to thirty songs on disc, with PlayStation 3 versions of the game allowing additional songs to be purchased from an online service. Players can remove a game disc from the console during gameplay and insert a new disc, giving them access to a new selection of songs. Most SingStar titles are loosely based upon musical genres, such as rock or pop music (SingStar Rocks! and SingStar Pop respectively). SingStar games are sometimes localised for release in different regions, with customised track lists to suit foreign markets and territories. The first artist-specific SingStar game (SingStar Die Toten Hosen) was released in Germany in 2007, with ABBA, Queen, Take That, Mecano and Vasco Rossi receiving similar releases in subsequent years.

PlayStation 3
The following tables list songs available on SingStar titles released for the PlayStation 3 video game console. Country of released is indicated by two-letter country codes. With the exception of localised titles, all games released in PAL territories have identical track lists to the UK version of the game. For titles which were localised for multiple markets, songs are either indicated as present ("Yes") or absent ("No") in the track list for each localised version.

SingStar

SingStar ABBA

SingStar Chartbreaker

SingStar Chart Hits

This is an Australian and New Zealand only game.

SingStar Dance

SingStar Guitar

SingStar Hits

SingStar Made In Germany

SingStar Mallorca Party

SingStar Mecano

SingStar Morangos com Açucar

SingStar Motown

SingStar Polskie Hity

SingStar Pop Edition

SingStar Queen

SingStar Take That

SingStar Vasco

SingStar Vol. 2

SingStar Vol. 3: Party Edition

SingStar The Wiggles

SingStar Ultimate Party
Note: This game was also released for the PlayStation 4.

See also
 List of songs in SingStar games (PlayStation 2)

References

External links

SingStar catalogues:

 Australia
 Denmark
 Germany
 Spain
 Finland
 France
 Italy
 Norway
 Portugal
 Sweden
 United Kingdom
 United States

PlayStation 3 games
SingStar
Lists of songs in music video games